Sébastien Fauqué is a French rugby union player, born 6 March 1977 in Tarbes (Hautes-Pyrénées), who plays as fly half for La Rochelle.

He arrived at US Montauban from US Dax after a spell at Castres Olympique and a first professional contract at Section Paloise. He was the backup for David Aucagne at Pau and Thomas Castaignède at Castres. He trained at two clubs: Riscle and Lourdes. After the 2008 season, and after six seasons at Montauban, he joined RC Toulon, who were promoted to Top 14.

Honours

Club 

 Pro D2 Champions : 2006

Personal 

 Best player of Pro D2: 2006 (383 points, 22 more than second placed Antoine Vignau-Tuquet)
  : 2005 (397 points, 18 less than first place Martin Vickers-Pearson)
 Best kicker in Pro D2: 2006 (353 points, 22 more than second placed Antoine Vigneau-Tuquet)
  : 2005 (377 points, 3 less than first placed Martin Vickers-Pearson)

Notes

External links 

  Player profile at lequipe.fr
  Statistics at itsrugby.fr

French rugby union players
Rugby union fly-halves
1977 births
Sportspeople from Tarbes
US Dax players
RC Toulonnais players
Living people
Stade Rochelais players